Reynolds Heights is a census-designated place located in Pymatuning Township and in Mercer County in the state of Pennsylvania. The community is located off Pennsylvania Route 18. As of the 2010 census the population was 2,061 residents.

References

Census-designated places in Mercer County, Pennsylvania
Census-designated places in Pennsylvania